Toninia is a genus of lichen-forming fungi in the family Ramalinaceae.

The genus was circumscribed by Abramo Bartolommeo Massalongo in Ric. Auton. Lich. Crost. on page 107 in 1852.

The genus name of Toninia is in honour of Carlo Tonini (1803–1877), who was an Italian chemist and botanist (Lichenology), who worked in Verona and was a member and President of the Academy of Agriculture.

Species
Toninia afferens 
Toninia alutacea 
Toninia australiensis 
Toninia cinereovirens 
Toninia coquimbensis 
Toninia diffracta 
Toninia episema 
Toninia leucina 
Toninia nashii 
Toninia plumbina 
Toninia poeltiana 
Toninia populorum 
Toninia scorigena 
Toninia squalescens 
Toninia squalida 
Toninia subdispersa 
Toninia subfuscae 
Toninia submesoidea 
Toninia subnitida 
Toninia subtalparum 
Toninia tecta 
Toninia thiopsora 
Toninia tristis 
Toninia ualae 
Toninia verrucariae 
Toninia wetmorei

References

Ramalinaceae
Lichen genera
Lecanorales genera
Taxa described in 1852
Taxa named by Abramo Bartolommeo Massalongo